Patricia Hill is a New Zealand Paralympian who competed in athletics. At the 1980 Summer Paralympics, she won a gold medal in the Slalom 2; a silver medal in the 200m 2; and a bronze medal in the 400m 2. At the 1984 Summer Paralympics, she won a gold medal in the Slalom 2, and silver medals in the Marathon 2 and Pentathlon 2. At the 1988 Summer Paralympics, she won bronze medals in the Marathon 2 and Slalom 3.

References

External links 
 
 

Living people
Year of birth missing (living people)
Paralympic athletes of New Zealand
Athletes (track and field) at the 1980 Summer Paralympics
Athletes (track and field) at the 1984 Summer Paralympics
Athletes (track and field) at the 1988 Summer Paralympics
Paralympic gold medalists for New Zealand
Paralympic silver medalists for New Zealand
Paralympic bronze medalists for New Zealand
Medalists at the 1980 Summer Paralympics
Medalists at the 1984 Summer Paralympics
Medalists at the 1988 Summer Paralympics
Paralympic medalists in athletics (track and field)
New Zealand wheelchair racers